The Internal Revenue Bulletin (also known as the IRB), is a weekly publication of the U.S. Internal Revenue Service that announces "official rulings and procedures of the Internal Revenue Service and for publishing Treasury Decisions, Executive Orders, Tax Conventions, legislation, court decisions, and other items of general interest." It began publication in 1919.

The proper citation for an item in the IRB is "YYYY-II I.R.B. PPP." The IRS ceased publication of the Cumulative Bulletin with the 2008–2 edition. All the Cumulative Bulletins are posted on the United States Government Printing Office Federal Digital System.

References

External links
Internal Revenue Bulletin

Internal Revenue Service
Publications of the United States government
Publications established in 1919
Publications disestablished in 2008